Birchcliff is a summer village in Alberta, Canada. It is located on the eastern shore of Sylvan Lake, south of Jarvis Bay Provincial Park.

Demographics 

In the 2016 Census of Population conducted by Statistics Canada, the Summer Village of Birchcliff had a population of 117 living in 44 of its 98 total private dwellings, a  change from its 2011 population of 112.

See also 
List of communities in Alberta
List of summer villages in Alberta
List of resort villages in Saskatchewan

References

External links 

1972 establishments in Alberta
Summer villages in Alberta